Tilmon is an unincorporated community in Caldwell County, in the U.S. state of Texas. According to the Handbook of Texas, the community had a population of 117 in 2000. It is located within the Greater Austin metropolitan area.

History
Tilmon developed around a mill called Tilmon's Mill. This mill made molasses from cane crops grown in the bottom of nearby creeks during the antebellum Texas era. A post office was established at Tilmon in 1890 and remained in operation until 1906. There was only one business and several homes in the settlement in 1936. It had 25 inhabitants and two businesses in 1940. Its population grew to 40 in 1949 and decreased back to 25 settlers from 1970 to 1990. There were no businesses in the community in 1990. The county highway map in 1984 showed a community hall near the roadway. Its population was 117 in 2000.

The Old Settler's Music Festival is held in the community.

Geography

Education
Tilmon had a school with one teacher and 47 students in 1905 and then had separate schools for African American and White children in 1936. Today the community is served by the Lockhart Independent School District.

References

Unincorporated communities in Caldwell County, Texas
Unincorporated communities in Texas